Captain Underpants and the Perilous Plot of Professor Poopypants is the fourth book in the Captain Underpants series written by Dav Pilkey. The book is about a mad scientist named Professor Pippy P. Poopypants becoming a new science teacher at Jerome Howritz Elementary. However, all the students laugh at his name.

The book received positive reviews.

Plot
At the southwest of Greenland, a scientist from the fictional country of New Swissland (with a foreign culture where everyone has a silly name) named Professor Pippy P. Poopypants goes to the United States to demonstrate how his Shrinky-Pig 2000 and Goosy-Grow 4000 can help the world by reducing garbage and increasing food, but everyone laughs at Poopypants' silly name rather than taking him seriously, of which is a incredible constant annoyance.

Meanwhile, the whole school is going to a pizza place called Piqua Pizza Palace, George and Harold decide to rearrange the letters on the nearby sign during the wait to get on the bus, but Mr. Krupp catches the boys and bans them from the school field trip, tasked with cleaning the teacher's lounge for the rest of the trip. However, the boys get their revenge by "modifying" things around in the teachers' lounge. After the trip, the teachers fall into George and Harold's trap and get largely covered in powder paste and Styrofoam pellets. The teachers run out of the lounge in horror, causing Mr. Fyde, the science teacher, to witness the teachers covered in these items and believe they're abominable snowmen.

Mr. Fyde resigns the next day, believing he's losing his sanity due to the incident the other day and having a dream by being eaten by a talking toilet, hearing cats and dogs in the classroom, then imagined that the school flooded with green goop, and seeing Captain Underpants, eventually leading to Mr. Fyde resigning in the Piqua Valley Home For The Reality-Challenged prompting Mr. Krupp to find a new science teacher.

Meanwhile, Professor Poopypants finds a ad to teach at the school and applies for the job, thinking children to be kind and sweet-hearted, but they spend days laughing at his silly name instead of learning anything. The professor only gets them interested by building a robot that makes gerbils jog along with them, but the interest is short-lived when George gets him to reveal his middle name (pee-pee). Sometime later, Ms. Ribble reads The Pied Piper of Hamelin, which inspires George and Harold to make a comic about the Professor trying to take over the world using an army of gerbils in suits, which makes Professor Poopypants furious and destroys the last of his sanity.

He decides to use the Goosy-Grow 4000 on the gerbil suit, climbs inside, then shrinks the school and holds them hostage. He then grows a pencil large and writes a system of three alphabetical name charts based on the first/last letter of each part of a first and last name to force people to change their names to silly ones (for example Benny Krupp = Lumpy Pottybiscuits). George and Harold (now Fluffy Toiletnose and Cheeseball Wafflefanny respectively) get Captain Underpants (now Buttercup Chickenfanny, but refuses to take the professor's order to change names) to steal Professor Poopypants' Goosy-Grow 4000, but he and the machine are shrunk in the process. The two of them try to enlarge the school back to normal size but get flicked off the school by Professor Poopypants. Cheeseball makes a paper airplane that Fluffy enlarges, allowing them to fly away, though they face many dangers, barely escaping a woodchipper, a dog, and a steamroller, until Captain Underpants rescues them. Fluffy then enlarges Captain Underpants (and Cheeseball's hand) to the robot's size, then they fight until Captain Underpants defeats Professor Poopypants and everyone's names are changed back to normal. The boys use the Shrinky-Pig 2000 and Goosy-Grow 4000 to bring themselves, the school (and everyone inside it) and Captain Underpants back to their normal sizes. Captain Underpants then dresses and is soaked with water, turning him back into Mr. Krupp.

Professor Poopypants is then arrested and hauled off to jail for his crimes. From the advice of George and Harold, he legally changes his name so that no one will make fun of it anymore. Unfortunately, he changes his name to that of his maternal grandfather's, Tippy Tinkletrousers, which only makes the prisoners (and police officers) laugh at him even more, much to his anger. Later in the treehouse, George and Harold reflect on the moral to not make fun of people, believing this to be their first story to have a moral.

Characters
George Beard/Fluffy Toiletnose - A 4th-grade student in Jerome Horwitz Elementary School.
Harold Hutchins/Cheeseball Wafflefanny - A 4th-grade student in Jerome Horwitz Elementary School.
Mr. Benjamin Krupp/Mr. Lumpy Pottybiscuits - A mean, rude principal in Jerome Horwitz Elementary School.
Captain Underpants (he did not change his name because he does not take orders from anybody) - Mr. Krupp's alter-ego.
Chuckles Jingleberry McMonkeyburger, Jr. - The president of New Swissland.
Stinky McMonkeyburger - The wife of the president of New Swissland.
Jiggles T. Chunkyskunks
Tipper Q. Zipperdripper
Professor Pippy Pee-Pee Poopypants/Tippy Tinkletrousers - The main antagonist in the book. He hates when people laugh at his name nonstop, even when he gets a job as a science teacher in Jerome Horwitz Elementary School. He forces everyone to change their names from his own Name-Change-O-Chart 2000, all except Captain Underpants, who is shrunk twice by him. When Poopypants is finally defeated by Captain Underpants, he returns everyone their old names and is arrested by the police.
Porkbelly Funkyskunk - Poopypants' assistant.
Connor Mancini/Buttercup Bananalips 
Aaron Mancini/Stinky Bananalips
Ingrid Ashley/Chim-Chim Diaperbrains - The newswoman of Channel 4 Eyewitness News.
Larry Zarrow/Booger Stinkersquirt 
Stephanie Yarkoff/Snotty Gorillabreath
Robbie Staenberg/Loopy Pizzapants
Janet Warwick/Poopsie Chucklebutt 
Melvin Sneedly/Pinky Pizzabrains 
Ivana Godadebafroom/Chim-Chim Lizardtushie 
Mr. Rected/Mr. Gizzardnose - One of the Jerome Horwitz teachers, who George and Harold pranked by turning them into abominable snowmen.
Miss Labler (mentioned)/ Miss Liverbuns (mentioned)
Ms. Tara Ribble/Ms. Falafel Gizzardtush - One of the Jerome Horwitz teachers, who George and Harold pranked by turning them into abominable snowmen.
Mr. Kenny B. Meaner/Mr. Flunky Bananabuns - The gym teacher, one of the Jerome Horwitz teachers, who George and Harold pranked by turning them into abominable snowmen.
Miss Edith Anthrope/Miss Crusty Diapertush - The school secretary, who George and Harold pranked by turning them into abominable snowmen.
Ms. Guided/ Ms. Lizardnose - One of the Jerome Horwitz teachers, who George and Harold pranked by turning them into abominable snowmen.
Mr. Morty Fyde/Mr. Pinky Barftush - He quit his job as a science teacher in the book.
Dr. Diaper/ Dr. Bubblebuns - One of Captain Underpants' past villains, who makes a cameo in Piqua State Penitentiary, laughing at Poopypants' new name (Tippy Tinkletrousers inherited from grandparents) among other jailbirds and guards.

Authors:
Cynthia Rylant/Buttercup Gizzardsniffer
Dav Pilkey/Gidget Hamsterbrains
Dan Santat/Gidget Pizzasniffer
Jose Garibaldi/Poopsie Lizardlips
Martin Ontiveros/Pinky Burgerfanny

See also
 Dav Pilkey
 Captain Underpants

Following book
The book that followed this was Captain Underpants and the Wrath of the Wicked Wedgie Woman (2002).

Reception
The book received mainly positive reviews from critics.

The main antagonist of the book, Professor Poopypants, would return in later books of the series as both a recurring character and even the main villain. He would also return in Captain Underpants: The First Epic Movie.

The book was removed from an elementary school in Page, North Dakota due to parental complaints.

References

2000 American novels
Captain Underpants novels
Fiction about size change
Scholastic Corporation books